Ah! Live! is the second live album by American rock singer Donnie Iris, released in 2009. Except for one studio recording, all of the songs were recorded at live concerts in Kittanning and Erie, Pennsylvania. The album's name comes from Donnie's first hit single, "Ah! Leah!" It is his fifteenth solo album.

Track listing 
"Your Touch" (Auerbach, Carney)
"Little Black Dress" (Avsec)
"Soul Man" (Porter, Hayes)
"Sweet Merilee" (Avsec, Iris)
"King Cool" (Avsec, Iris)
"I Can't Hear You (Avsec, Iris, McClain, Hoenes, Valentine)
"Rocque Fantastique" (Avsec)
"I Can't Really Miss You (If You Never Go Away)" (Avsec)
"Love Is Like a Rock" (Avsec, Iris, McClain, Hoenes, Valentine)
"Ah! Leah!" (Avsec, Iris)
"The Rapper" (Iris)
"Hush" (South)

Personnel 
Donnie Iris – lead vocals
Mark Avsec – keyboards and background vocals
Marty Lee Hoenes – guitar and background vocals
Paul Goll – bass guitar and background vocals
Kevin Valentine – drums
Albritton McClain- bass guitar and background vocals (track 1)

Production 
Mark Avsec – producer
Rick Witowski – co-producer
Donnie Iris – co-producer

References 

Donnie Iris albums
Albums produced by Mark Avsec
2009 live albums